"Stripper Vicar" is a song by Chester rock band Mansun released in 1996. It was the lead track of Three EP and was the band's fifth release overall. The single was the group's first with the group's new drummer, Andie Rathbone.
The EP became Mansun's first top twenty hit peaking at #19 on the UK Singles Chart.
Three EP was released on Two CDs, and 7" Vinyl. "Stripper Vicar" and "An Open Letter To The Lyrical Trainspotter" were included on the group's début album, though the single was left off US editions.

In Japan the majority of the Three EP was compiled with three tracks from the group's earlier Two EP release under the title Special Mini Album (Japan Only EP).

Track listing

Personnel

Mansun
 Dominic Chad - Guitar, Backing Vocals
 Paul Draper - Vocals, Guitar
 Andie Rathbone - Drums
 Stove - Bass

Production
 Mike Hunter - Engineering Assistance ("Stripper Vicar", "Things Keep Falling Off Buildings")
 Ronnie Stone - Engineering ("Stripper Vicar", "Things Keep Falling Off Buildings")
 Clif Norrell - Mixing ("Stripper Vicar", "Things Keep Falling Off Buildings")
 Ian Caple - Engineering (all tracks) and Mixing ("The Edge", "The Duchess", "An Open Letter To The Lyrical Trainspotter", "No One Knows Us")

Chart positions

References

1996 singles
Mansun songs
Songs written by Paul Draper (musician)
1996 songs
Parlophone singles